Filipović is a patronymic formed out of the name Filip and the suffix -ić. It is a common surname in South Slavic languages. It's cognate to Bulgarian Filipov or Polish Filipowicz.

It may refer to:

 
 Andrija Filipović, Croatian football player
 Benjamin Filipović, Bosnian film director
 
 
 Jakov Filipović, Croatian football player
 Jill Filipovic, American author and lawyer of Serbian descent
 Josip Filipović, Croatian general in the Austro-Hungarian army
 Marko Filipović, Bosnian football player
 Mirko Filipović, Croatian kickboxer and mixed martial artist
 Miroslav Filipović, Croatian World War II war criminal 
 Muhamed Filipović, Bosnian academic, writer, essayist, theorist and philosopher
 
 Ognjen Filipović, Serbian canoer
 
 Stefan Filipović, Montenegrin singer
 Stjepan Filipović, Croatian-born Yugoslav Partisan
 Tarik Filipović, Bosnian and Croatian actor and television presenter
 Teodor Filipović, Serbian writer, jurist and educator
 Zlata Filipović, Bosnian author
 Zoran Filipović, Montenegrin football player and coach

See also
 Pilipović

Croatian surnames
Montenegrin surnames
Serbian surnames
Patronymic surnames
Surnames from given names